Angel Rubio (born April 12, 1975) is a former American football defensive end who played one season with the Arizona Cardinals of the National Football League (NFL). He was drafted by the Pittsburgh Steelers in the seventh round of the 1998 NFL Draft. Rubio played college football at Southeast Missouri State University and attended Ceres High School in Ceres, California. He was also a member of the San Francisco 49ers, Cincinnati Bengals, Orlando Predators, Las Vegas Outlaws, Detroit Fury, Dallas Desperados and Austin Wranglers.

Early years
Rubio garnered All-District and All-League recognition at Ceres High School.

College career
Rubio played for the Southeast Missouri State Redhawks from 1993 to 1997, recording a total of 330 tackles. He set Southeast Missouri career records with 21.5 sacks and 44.0 tackles for loss. He earned American Football Coaches Association and The Sports Network First-team Division I-AA All-American honors as well as Associated Press and Football Gazette Second-team Division I-AA All-American honors his senior year in 1997. Rubio was also named the Ohio Valley Conference Defensive Player of the Year in 1997 after recording 114 tackles and seven sacks. He garnered First-team All-OVC recognition in 1997 as well as Second-team All-OVC accolades in 1994 and 1996. He missed the 1995 season due to a knee injury. Rubio was inducted into the Southeast Missouri Athletics Hall of Fame in 2014.

Professional career
Rubio was drafted by the Pittsburgh Steelers of the NFL with the 221st pick in the 1998 NFL Draft. He was signed by the Steelers in May 1998. He was traded to the San Francisco 49ers on August 24, 1998. Rubio was waived by the 49ers on September 22, 1998. He was signed by the NFL's Cincinnati Bengals on September 23, 1998, but released a week later. He was then re-signed to the San Francisco 49ers' practice squad in October 1998. Rubio was released by the 49ers on September 6, 1999. He signed with the Arizona Cardinals of the NFL on September 6, 1999. He was released on September 27 and re-signed on November 3, 1999. Rubio appeared in the final two games of the season. He was selected by the Las Vegas Outlaws of the XFL with the 181st pick in the XFL Draft. He was named to the XFL's all league first-team. Rubio was signed by the Orlando Predators of the Arena Football League (AFL) on May 25, 2001. He was traded to the Detroit Fury on November 6, 2002. He was released by the Fury on April 27, 2004. Rubio was signed by the AFL's Dallas Desperados on April 29, 2004. He was released on September 29, 2004. He was signed by the Austin Wranglers of the AFL on November 8, 2004. Rubio was released by the Wranglers on January 10, 2007.

References

External links
Detroit Fury bio (2003)
Just Sports Stats

Living people
1975 births
Players of American football from Los Angeles
American football defensive ends
Southeast Missouri State Redhawks football players
Pittsburgh Steelers players
San Francisco 49ers players
Cincinnati Bengals players
Arizona Cardinals players
Las Vegas Outlaws (XFL) players
Orlando Predators players
Detroit Fury players
Dallas Desperados players
Austin Wranglers players
People from Ceres, California